Libya competed at the 2011 World Championships in Athletics from August 27 to September 4 in Daegu, South Korea as the host nation. One athlete, marathon runner Ali Mabrouk El Zaidi, appeared in the Official Start List
to represent the country
in the event.

Results

Men

References

External links
Official local organising committee website
Official IAAF competition website

Nations at the 2011 World Championships in Athletics
2011
World Championships in Athletics